Bargoed is a town and community in the Rhymney Valley, Wales, one of the South Wales Valleys. It lies on the Rhymney River in the county borough of Caerphilly. It straddles the ancient boundary of Glamorgan and Monmouthshire, with Bargoed lying in Glamorgan and Aberbargoed in Monmouthshire. 'Greater Bargoed', as defined by the local authority Caerphilly County Borough Council, consists of the towns of Bargoed and Aberbargoed and the village of Gilfach. The combined population of these settlements is about 13,000. The town's rugby club Bargoed RFC holds the world record for the most consecutive league wins in a row and was World Rugby magazine's team of the year in 2005.
The town’s football team AFC Bargoed who also hold a rich history are currently rebuilding and have a good young squad, finishing 2nd in the TERV Premier League 2022

Toponymy
The name of the town is derived from that of the River Bargoed, which itself is based on the Welsh word  "border, boundary". The change from Bargod to Bargoed is recorded from the sixteenth century onwards and was probably a hypercorrection under the influence of  "trees, woods", perhaps reinforced by nearby place names such as Pen-y-coed, Argoed and Blackwood.

History
Originally a market town, Bargoed grew into a substantial town following the opening of a colliery in 1903. By 1921 Bargoed had a population of 17,901; this has been steadily declining since that time, as the general demand for Welsh coal continued to fall. The colliery, which was the subject of a painting by L. S. Lowry, closed during the 1970s, and its former site is now a country park.

The town was home to a factory built by the Austin Motor Company from 1949. This was a project by Austin chairman Leonard Lord, with government funding, to employ miners suffering from pneumoconiosis, a lung disease caused by prolonged inhalation of dust. In 1945 it was estimated that 5000 miners in the South Wales region were affected by the condition to the extent that they could not work in the coal industry. The Austin factory at Bargoed became the first factory in the world where every employee was registered as disabled. Ex-miners could work at Bargoed under full-time medical supervision and with medical facilities on-site at the factory. The factory work was understandably light, with the main product being the J40 children's pedal car. The success and efficiency of the factory was such that 150 men were employed by 1953 and Austin began the manufacture of small metal pressings for its full-size cars, such as dashboard parts, car registration plates and rocker covers at Bargoed. By 1965 over 500 men, all pneumoconiosis sufferers, were working at the factory. Production of the J40 pedal cars ended in 1971 but the factory's other work kept it open. Improving conditions in the mining industry and the slow reduction in the number of mines and workers in the region meant that the factory's purpose began to become redundant during the 1980s. The numbers employed slowly dropped and new workers did not have to be pneumoconiosis sufferers. The end of production of the Austin A-Series engine in 1999, the rocker cover of which was made solely in Bargoed, meant that the factory (then under the ownership of the Rover Group) employing 45 people, of which only 11 were registered as disabled, closed.

Governance
An electoral ward with the same name exists. At the 2011 census this ward had a population of 6,196.

Redevelopment

The town has been undergoing a major redevelopment scheme, which included a bypass (running through the valley, with links to Bargoed town centre, Aberbargoed and Gilfach), Morrisons supermarket and petrol station, a new bus station, repaving the road though the heart of the town, a 400+ space car park, new library, 3 new offices, a relaxation area where the old bus station was on Hanbury Square, and 7 retail units. There are ongoing issues with plans for a state of the art Odeon Cinema and the site remains undeveloped (summer 2015). A redevelopment of the former Plasnewydd Hotel has created Murray's.

The Grade II* listed Hanbury Road Baptist chapel has been converted into a public library which includes a council services helpdesk, a computer suite, a coffee lounge, and a scaled-down chapel; the pipe organ (now silent), occupies its original dominant position overlooking the main ground floor area, while the erstwhile chapel gallery houses a substantial collection of reference and other books. At the rear of the library a new mini park has been created using 40 ft flower sculptures.

The sites of the former collieries of Bargoed, Gilfach, and Britannia have been landscaped as a recreational nature park with a network of paths on either side of the Rhymney river. Figures of mine workers from these three communities have become the inspiration for wooden sculptures in the park, while in Hanbury Square a group of three immense heads of colliery workers dominates the tiered piazza.

Transport
The town is served by Bargoed railway station with services to Cardiff, Penarth, and Barry; Bargoed Bus Interchange is situated at the northern end of the town, with local services and routes to nearby Blackwood, Ystrad Mynach, Caerphilly, and Newport among others.

The A469 by-pass road connects with the A465 Heads of the Valleys road to the north and the A470 to the south, serving Cardiff and linking with the east-west M4 motorway.

Education
Bargoed Grammar Technical School existed as the local grammar school before Heolddu Comprehensive School was formed. Some of the grammar school's buildings in Park Crescent were used from the 1980s until 2002 for the valley's first Welsh language comprehensive school, Ysgol Gyfun Cwm Rhymni, which has now moved to a new purpose-built site in Fleur-de-Lys. Primary Schools include St Gwladys Bargoed School, Park Primary School, Aberbargoed Primary School, Gilfach Fargoed Primary School and a Welsh school Ysgol Gymraeg Gilfach Fargod. Heolddu Comprehensive School serves the local area as the main secondary school.

Notable people

See :Category:People from Bargoed
 Nathan Cleverly (born 1987), World Champion boxer, grew up in Bargoed and went to Heolddu Comprehensive School
 Sam Cookson (born 1891), footballer, was born in Bargoed
 Hefin David (born 1977), Member of the Senedd (MS), went to school in Bargoed and his office is based in Bargoed YMCA
 Bradley Dredge (born 1973), golfer, Golf World Cup winner, twice European Tour winner, is a lifetime member at Bargoed Golf Club and started his career here
 James Fox (born 1976), singer-songwriter and British Eurovision contestant
 Doris Hare (1905–2000), actress, born in Bargoed
 Alun Hoddinott (1929–2008), a composer of classical music, one of the first Welsh composers to receive international recognition
 Graham Moore (1941–2016), played football for Bargoed YM (now AFC Bargoed), represented Wales 1959–1970.
 Steffanie Newell (born 1994), professional wrestler formerly signed to WWE under the name Tegan Nox, born in Bargoed and attended Heolddu Comprehensive School
 Morgan Phillips (1902–1963), General Secretary of the Labour Party from 1944 to 1961, brought up in Bargoed
 Ivor Powell (1916–2012), former professional footballer and manager, was born in Gilfach-Bargoed on 5 July 1916
 Lauren Price MBE (born 1994), professional boxer, Olympic Gold Medalist, attended Heolddu Comprehensive School in Bargoed and was brought up in Mc Donell Rd Bargoed 
 David Probert (born 1988), British flat racing Champion Apprentice jockey 2008, attended Ysgol Gymraeg Gilfach Fargod and Ysgol Gyfun Cwm Rhymni
 Robbie Regan (born 1968) former world boxing champion grew up and trained in Bargoed, he still lives in the town
 John Tripp (1927–1986) Anglo-Welsh poet and short-story writer, born in Bargoed
 Adam Woodyatt (born 1968), actor, had grandparents who lived in Bargoed and had a summer job in the local butchers
 Ray Bishop (footballer) started his career at Bargoed AFC Youth before representing Cardiff City F.C amongst other clubs

References

External links 

www.geography.co.uk : photos of Bargoed and surrounding area
St Gwladys Bargoed Primary School

 
Towns in Caerphilly County Borough
Communities in Caerphilly County Borough